Man Airport  is an airport serving Man, Côte d'Ivoire.

Airlines and destinations

See also
Transport in Côte d'Ivoire

References

 OurAirports - Man
 Great Circle Mapper - Man
 Google Earth

Airports in Ivory Coast
Buildings and structures in Montagnes District
Man, Ivory Coast